Ricardo Mello was the defending champion but decided not to participate.
Thiago Alves won the title after defeating Gastão Elias 7–6(7–5), 7–6(7–1) in the final.

Seeds

Draw

Final four

Top half

Bottom half

References
 Main Draw
 Qualifying Draw

Aberto de Sao Paulo - Singles
2012 Singles
2012 in Brazilian tennis